Drzewica - is a Polish coat of arms that was used by many noble families in medieval Poland and later under the Polish–Lithuanian Commonwealth.

History

Blazon

Notable bearers
Notable bearers of this Coat of Arms include:
 Walerian Protasewicz

See also
 Polish heraldry
 Heraldry
 Coat of Arms
 List of Polish nobility coats of arms

Bibliography

 Tadeusz Gajl: Herbarz polski od średniowiecza do XX wieku : ponad 4500 herbów szlacheckich 37 tysięcy nazwisk 55 tysięcy rodów. L&L, 2007. .

Polish coats of arms